Vibrate refers to the act of vibration. Vibrate may also refer to:

Vibrate (The Manhattan Transfer album), a 2004 album by The Manhattan Transfer
Vibrate: The Best of Rufus Wainwright, a 2014 album by Rufus Wainwright
"Vibrate", a song by Outkast from their 2003 album, Speakerboxxx/The Love Below
"Vibrate", a song by Rufus Wainwright from his 2003 album, Want One
"Vibrate", a song by Petey Pablo from his 2004 album, Still Writing in My Diary: 2nd Entry
"Vibrate", a song by English DJ Tazer released in 2016 as a single
"12.38", a song by Childish Gambino originally titled "Vibrate" from his 2020 album, 3.15.20